Tando Gulshah(), is a village in the Naushahro Feroze District, of Sindh, Pakistan.

Kandiaro Taluka